Spin The Glass Web is a mystery or suspense novel written by Max Ehrlich and first published in condensed form in Cosmopolitan in 1951.  The full version was published by Harper & Brothers in 1952, and in paperback by Bantam Books in 1953.

Plot
An eminently successful screenwriter finds himself mixed up in a murder.   The police want him.  Can he prove his innocence?

References

1952 American novels
American mystery novels
Harper & Brothers books